The Challenger  Stakes is a Grade III American Thoroughbred horse race for horses four years old or older over a distance of  miles on the dirt track in early March at Tampa Bay Downs, Oldsmar, Florida. The event currently carries a purse of $100,000.

History 
The race was inaugurated in 1987 as a late season two-year-old event in the last week of December. For five years between 1992 and 1996 the event was not held.

In 1997 the event was renewed as a three-year-old event and scheduled in February over the shorter distance of 7 furlongs and in 1998 the event received sponsorship from Budweiser which continued until 2007. In 1999 the event was moved to the turf track at a longer distance of one mile.

In 2004 the conditions of the event were changed, in that four-year-olds and older could enter. The distance was extended to the now  miles and the running was on the dirt track.

In 2020 the event was upgraded to a Grade III event.

Records
Speed record: 
 miles  – 1:41.89 – Flameaway  (2019)
 1 mile – 1:33.79  – Lucky J J (2000)

Margins: 
  lengths – Darian's Reason  (1990)

Most wins by a jockey:
 3 – Willie Martinez  (1991, 2010, 2011)

Most wins by a trainer:
 4 – Todd A. Pletcher (2001, 2011, 2015, 2017)

Winners

Legend:

 
 

Notes:

† Cannon Dancer was first past the post but was disqualified and placed second and Strike the Knight declared the winner

See also
List of American and Canadian Graded races

External sites
Tampa Bay Downs Media Guide 2021

References

Graded stakes races in the United States
Grade 3 stakes races in the United States
Recurring sporting events established in 1987
Sports competitions in Tampa, Florida
1987 establishments in Florida
Turf races in the United States
Tampa Bay Downs
Horse races in Florida